Merveilles is the third studio album by Japanese rock band Malice Mizer, released on March 18, 1998 by Nippon Columbia. It is the band's only album on a major record label. In 2004, it was named one of the top albums from 1989–1998 in an issue of the music magazine Band Yarouze.

Summary
merveilles is the band's first album on a major record label, being released by Nippon Columbia (Midi:Nette established "Maitrize" for all the Major label releases). Its title was coined by Gackt as a keyword to the theme. Its overall concept is "a story that goes back and forth between the present, the past and the future across time". However, the lyrics are not set in the real world as it is, but in the fairy-tale world, the medieval world and the future world. This album marked the pinnacle of the band's success, being their best-selling album, charting high on the Oricon charts, and also earned them several national TV appearances. Japanese pop culture website Real Sound credited Malice Mizer as the first visual kei band to incorporate European aesthetics into heavy metal with the twin guitars in "Bel Air ~Kuuhaku no Toki no Naka De~".

In 1998, the band played live at the Nippon Budokan which involved a large building as a stage prop and elaborate theatrics; each member performing a skit with another on their own (including a skit in which Gackt fell to the stage to sing the song "Le Ciel", and returned to "Heaven" by song's [and concert's] end). It was a success and was released on home video as merveilles ~Shuuen to Kisuu~ l'espace. In July 1998, the Yokohama Arena's stage would be the last for Gackt as in January 1999, his departure was announced.

A few months after his departure, drummer Kami died of a subarachnoid hemorrhage on June 21. But the band continued to exist, as Kami was replaced by a non-official, supporting member, and new vocalist Klaha was recruited. By then the band had abandoned the lighter pop music sound of the Gackt era for a dramatic mixture of Baroque music, gothic, metal and electronic music, and adopted an elaborate funeral Goth look.

Release
Merveilles was released on March 18, 1998, by Columbia. In the fifth counting week of March it reached number two on the Oricon charts, with sales of 169,290 copies, while in the first week of April it charted at number twelve with sales of 41,900 copies. It charted for sixteen weeks. By the end of the year it had sold 307,450 copies, was the 73rd best-selling album of the year.

Also, the album singles are the most successful in the band's history. In 1997, "Bel Air" and "Au Revoir" were released, both of which reached number forty-two and ten, while the latter was the band's first top ten entry on the charts, and charted for eleven weeks. In 1998, prior the album's release, "Gekka no Yasoukyoku" was released, which reached number eleven, and charted for twelve weeks. It was later followed by "Illuminati", which reached number seven, and "Le Ciel", their best charting single, which reached number four. It was the band's only single written and composed by Gackt.

Both Merveilles and its single "Gekka no Yasoukyoku" were certified Gold by the RIAJ for sales over 200,000.

Reception
In 2021, Jamie Cansdale of Kerrang! included Merveilles on a list of 13 essential Japanese rock and metal albums. He wrote that with it, Malice Mizer embraced "antiquated piano and violin fanfare, resulting in symphonic ballads and avant-garde pomp heavier than anything on the airwaves at the time."

Track listing

Personnel

Personnel
Vocals, piano: Gackt
Guitar, synthesizer: Közi, Mana
Bass: Yu~ki
Drums: Kami 
Cello: Masashi Abe  
Violin: Chieko Kinbara, Toshihiro Nakanishi
Programmers (all instruments and computer programming): Gackt, Kami, Közi, Mana, Yu~ki 
Programmer (synthesizer programming), sound designer: Nobuhiko Nakayama 
Technician (sound adviser), keyboards: Yohei Shimada
Arrangement by Malice Mizer, Yohei Shimada (tracks 2, 3, 5, 7, 10–12)

Production
Producer: Malice Mizer
Executive producer: Nobuhiko Miyazawa, Yukie Ito 
Engineers (additional): Hideyuki Hanaki, Hirohito Fujishima 
Recorded and mixed by Atsuo Akabae
Mastered by Masao Nakazato

Design
Art direction, cover collage, design: Teruhisa Abe 
Design: Hiroyuki Komagai, Takaaki Inoue 
Photography: Masatoshi Makino

References

1998 albums
Malice Mizer albums